Aleksander Jagiełło (born 2 February 1995 in Warsaw) is a Polish footballer who plays as a winger.

Career 

Jagiełło is a youth exponent from Legia Warsaw. He made his debut in the Polish Ekstraklasa at 22 July 2013 in a 2-2 away draw against Lechia Gdańsk. He played the full 90 minutes. His loan was cut-short in January 2014.

On 30 January 2014 he was loaned to Lechia Gdańsk until the end of the season.

On 18 July 2015 he joined Dolcan Ząbki on loan. The loan finished on 29 February 2016.

On 10 June 2017 he signed a contract with Ekstraklasa side Piast Gliwice. He was loaned out to Chojniczanka Chojnice on 15 January 2020 for the rest of the season.

References

External links
 
 

1995 births
Living people
Polish footballers
Association football midfielders
Ekstraklasa players
I liga players
II liga players
Legia Warsaw players
Lechia Gdańsk players
Podbeskidzie Bielsko-Biała players
Ząbkovia Ząbki players
Arka Gdynia players
Znicz Pruszków players
Piast Gliwice players
Górnik Łęczna players
Chojniczanka Chojnice players
Footballers from Warsaw
Poland youth international footballers